Gian Francesco de Majo (24 March 1732 – 17 November 1770) was an Italian composer. He is best known for his more than 20 operas. He also composed a considerable amount of sacred works, including oratorios, cantatas, and masses.

Life and career
Born in Naples, Majo was the son of composer Giuseppe de Majo. He began his musical education with his father and then studied with his uncle Gennaro Manna and his great uncle Francesco Feo. At the age of 13 he became the harpsichordist at the royal chapel in Naples and at 15 began helping his father with his duties there as maestro di cappella. In 1758 he was made second organist at the royal chapel. On 7 February 1759 his first opera, Ricimero, re dei goti, premiered in Parma. This was soon followed by a series of successful operas mounted in Naples.

In 1761 and 1763 Majo traveled to Northern Italy, where he presented several of his compositions and studied for a short period with Giovanni Battista Martini. After a short time in Naples, he went to the court in Vienna, where he was commissioned to write the opera Alcide negli orti esperidi for the coronation of Joseph II, Holy Roman Emperor. He then spent some time in Mannheim and Madrid before returning to Italy in 1765.

Majo continued to work as an organist at the royal chapel in Naples, ultimately succeeding his father as maestro di cappella in 1767. Having contracted tuberculosis in 1760, Majo ultimately succumbed to the disease and died of it ten years later.

Works
Ricimero, re dei goti (1759) Parma
Cajo Fabrizio (1760) Naples
Astrea placata (1760) Naples
Almeria (1761) Livorno
Artaserse (1762) Venice
Catone in Utica (1762) Turin
Demofoonte (1763) Rome
Alcide negli orti esperidi (1764) Vienna
Ifigenia in Tauride (Majo) (1764) Mannheim 
Montezuma (1765) Turin
La costanza fortunata (La constancia dichosa) (1765) Madrid
Alessandro (nell'Indie) (1765) Mannheim
Antigono (1767) Venice
Antigona (1768) Rome
Ipermestra (1768) Naples
Adriano in Siria (1769) Rome
Didone abbandonata (1770) Venice
Eumene (1st act) (1771) Naples

References

External links
 

1732 births
1770 deaths
18th-century Italian male musicians
Italian Classical-period composers
Neapolitan school composers
18th-century Italian composers
Italian male classical composers
Italian opera composers
Male opera composers